Kévin David Nogueira Carvalho Santos (born 20 November 1999) is a Portuguese professional footballer who plays for York United in the Canadian Premier League.

Early life
He began his youth career in Portugal with Alverca. In 2013, he had a trial with the Manchester City Academy. He later played youth football with Vilafranquense and Vitória de Setúbal, eventually joining the U23 side of the latter.

Club career
In 2019, Santos joined Tadcaster Albion in the English eighth-tier Northern Premier League Division One North West. He made his debut against Prescot Cables.

In July 2021, he joined Darlington of the sixth-tier National League North, after having impressed the club during an FA Cup match with Tadcaster against Darlington in the previous October. He scored his first goal on 2 October against AFC Telford United. His goal against AFC Fylde was named the Goal of the Season. During his only season at Darlington he scored four goals in 41 appearances across all competitions.

On 12 July 2022, he joined Canadian Premier League club York United. He made his debut on 15 July against Pacific FC in a substitute appearance.

Career statistics

References

External links

Kevin Santos at ZeroZero

1999 births
Living people
Association football forwards
Portuguese footballers
Portuguese expatriate footballers
Northern Premier League players
National League (English football) players
Canadian Premier League players
F.C. Alverca players
U.D. Vilafranquense players
Vitória F.C. players
Tadcaster Albion A.F.C. players
Darlington F.C. players
York United FC players